Abarkuh County is in Yazd province, Iran. The capital of the county is the city of Abarkuh. At the 2006 census, the county's population was 42,610 in 11,660 households. The following census in 2011 counted 46,662 people in 13,640 households. At the 2016 census, the county's population was 51,552 in 16,026 households.

Administrative divisions

The population history of Abarkuh County's administrative divisions over three consecutive censuses is shown in the following table. The latest census shows two districts, four rural districts, and two cities.

See also
Castle of Khosrow abad

References

 

Counties of Yazd Province